Dasyfidonia avuncularia, the red-winged wave, is a species of geometrid moth in the family Geometridae. It is found in North America.

The MONA or Hodges number for Dasyfidonia avuncularia is 6426.

References

Further reading

External links

 

Boarmiini
Articles created by Qbugbot
Moths described in 1858